Cantata Laxatón is the second album by Les Luthiers, released in August 1972.

Track listing

Side one
 "Cantata Laxatón" (music and lyrics: Gerardo Masana; arrangements & conduction: Carlos López Puccio) 17:45

Side two
 "Bolero de Mastropiero" (music and lyrics: Jorge Maronna & Carlos López Puccio) 5:48
 "Tristezas del Manuela" (music: Ernesto Acher) 3:03
 "Pieza en forma de tango" (music and lyrics: Jorge Maronna & Carlos López Puccio) 4:14
 "Si no fuera santiagueño" (lyrics: Ernesto Acher, Carlos López Puccio & Marcos Mundstock; music: Ernesto Acher & Jorge Maronna) 3:42
 "Vals del segundo" (music: Les Luthiers) 2:52

Les Luthiers albums
1972 albums